Ronald Mark Evans (born April 17, 1949 in Los Angeles, California) is an American Biologist, Professor and Head of the Salk’s Gene Expression Laboratory, and the March of Dimes Chair in Molecular and Developmental Biology at the Salk Institute for Biological Studies in La Jolla, California and a Howard Hughes Medical Institute Investigator. Dr. Ronald M. Evans is known for his original discoveries of nuclear hormone receptors (NR), a special class of transcriptional factor, and the elucidation of their universal mechanism of action, a process that governs how lipophilic hormones and drugs regulate virtually every developmental and metabolic pathway in animals and humans. Nowadays, NRs are among the most widely investigated group of pharmaceutical targets in the world, already yielding benefits in drug discovery for cancer, muscular dystrophies, osteoporosis, type II diabetes, obesity, and cardiovascular diseases.  His current research focuses on the function of nuclear hormone signaling and their function in metabolism and cancer.

He received his Bachelor of Science and PhD (1974) from UCLA, followed by a postdoctoral training at Rockefeller University with James E. Darnell. He became a faculty member at the Salk Institute in 1978 and Adjunct Professor in Biology, Biomedical Sciences, Neuroscience at UCSD (1985, 1989, 1995). He was named March of Dimes Chair in Molecular and Developmental Neurobiology at the Salk Institute in 1998.

His work on nuclear receptor was well recognized, thus he is a recipient of more than 40 nationally or internationally acclaimed awards and honors. In 2003 he was awarded the March of Dimes Prize in Developmental Biology. He received the Albert Lasker Award for Basic Medical Research (2004). He is also recipient of the Harvey Prize (2006), the Gairdner Foundation International Award (2006), the Albany Medical Center Prize (2007), the Wolf Prize in Medicine (2012) and the Louisa Gross Horwitz Prize (2018). He is a member of the National Academy of Sciences since 1989, a member of American Society for Microbiology since 1993, a member of American Academy of Arts and Sciences since 1997, a member of  the National Academy of Medicine since 2003, a member of European Molecular Biology Organization since 2006, a member of the American Philosophical Society since 2007, an elected fellow of the American Association for Cancer Research in 2014, named AAAS fellow in 2018 and a member of the National Academy of Inventors in 2018. Consistent with the broad impact of his work, he is listed by the Institute of Scientific Information as one of the most cited scientists of the past decade.

Research 
Members of the nuclear receptor (NR) superfamily of ligand-regulated transcription factors play important roles in reproduction, development, and physiology. In humans, genetic mutations in NRs are causes of rare diseases, while hormones and drugs that target NRs are in widespread therapeutic use. In 80s, Dr. Evans successfully cloned the first nuclear hormone receptor, the human glucocorticoid receptor. This action led to the finding of a superfamily of nuclear hormone receptors, all with similar molecular and genetic structures. Other of his pioneering studies include investigate hormones’ normal activities and their roles in disease, including a major discovery of nuclear hormone receptors, which respond to steroid hormones, vitamin A, vitamin D, thyroid hormones, and bile acids. By targeting genes these receptors help control sugar, salt, calcium, cholesterol, and fat metabolism. They are primary targets in breast, prostate, and pancreatic cancers and leukemia treatment and have therapeutic roles in chronic inflammation, osteoporosis, and type 2 diabetes and asthma. His muscle metabolism studies led to the discovery of exercise mimetics, which promote the benefits of fitness without training and may help battle the obesity epidemic, diabetes, heart disease, and frailty.

Honors
2021 The Asan Award in Medicine
2018 The Louisa Gross Horwitz Prize (shared with Pierre Chambon and Bert W. O’Malley)
2012 The Wolf Prize in Medicine
2007 The Albany Medical Center Prize (shared with Solomon H. Snyder and Robert J. Lefkowitz)
2006 The Harvey Prize:"Discovery of a super-family of genes encoding nuclear hormone receptors and the elucidation of their universal ability to affect gene expression and thereby virtually every developmental and metabolic pathway."
2006 The Gairdner Foundation International Award
2005 The Grande Médaille D'Or (Grand Gold Medal)
2005 The Glenn T. Seaborg Medal
2004 The Albert Lasker Award for Basic Medical Research (shared with Pierre Chambon and Elwood V. Jensen)
2003 The Keio Medical Science Prize
1999 The Fred Conrad Koch award
1995 The Dickson Prize
1994 California Scientist of the Year
1993 The Edwin B. Astwood Lecture award

References

External links
 Evans career and bio
 Evans career and biography
 Evans biography
 Announcement of Evans receiving Albert Lasker Award
 ISI Highly Cited page

21st-century American biologists
Jewish biologists
Members of the United States National Academy of Sciences
Howard Hughes Medical Investigators
Living people
1949 births
Wolf Prize in Medicine laureates
Recipients of the Albert Lasker Award for Basic Medical Research
Salk Institute for Biological Studies people
Scientists from Los Angeles
Members of the National Academy of Medicine